José Gerardo Rodolfo Fernández Noroña (born 19 March 1960) is a Mexican politician from the Labor Party (formerly from the Party of the Democratic Revolution).

Biography 
From 2009 to 2012 Fernández Noroña served as Deputy of the LXI Legislature of the Mexican Congress representing the Federal District. He again served in the Chamber of Deputies, starting in 2018, representing Mexico City, elected in the Labor Party.

He holds a Bachelors in Sociology from Universidad Autónoma Metropolitana-Azcapotzalco.

Controversies 

On 22 April 2019 he was criticized for requesting nude pictures from a female twitter user.

In July 2021, he tested positive for COVID-19. He's been criticized for spreading COVID-19 misinformation, such as stating that face masks are not helpful in avoiding the spread of the virus. In January 2022, he tested positive for the second time.

In 2022 PAN senator Lilly Tellez referred to Noroña as "Changoleon", the homeless person who became a TV personality in Mexico. Tellez said: "Pay attention to me Changoleón because you are the political arm of organized crime", referring to Noroña's political party, in alliance with the government party, Morena.

References

1960 births
Living people
Mexican Marxists
Mexican communists
Politicians from Mexico City
Mexican sociologists
Deputies of the LXIV Legislature of Mexico
COVID-19 misinformation
Party of the Democratic Revolution politicians
Labor Party (Mexico) politicians
21st-century Mexican politicians
Universidad Autónoma Metropolitana alumni
Members of the Chamber of Deputies (Mexico) for Mexico City
Deputies of the LXI Legislature of Mexico